Dichelyma is a genus of mosses belonging to the family Fontinalaceae.

he species of this genus are found in Eurasia and Northern America.

Species:
 Dichelyma brevinerve Kindb. 
 Dichelyma capillaceum Myrin, 1833

References

Hypnales
Moss genera